Zardalu Sofla (also Romanized as Zardālū Soflá; also known as Zardālū) is a village in Nurabad Rural District, in the Central District of Delfan County, Lorestan Province, Iran.

At the 2006 census, the village's population was 14, distributed over 4 families.

References 

Towns and villages in Delfan County